This is a list of airports in Uruguay, sorted alphabetically by ICAO code.

Uruguay, officially known as Oriental Republic of Uruguay, is a country located in the southeastern part of South America. Uruguay's only land border is with Brazil, to the north. To the west lies the Uruguay River, to the southwest lies the estuary of Río de la Plata, with Argentina only a short commute across the banks of either of these bodies of water, while to the southeast lies the South Atlantic Ocean. Uruguay is the second smallest country in South America, being larger only than Suriname.

Airport
Airport names shown in bold indicate the airport has scheduled service on commercial airlines.

See also 
 Transport in Uruguay
 Uruguayan Air Force (Fuerza Aérea Uruguaya)
 List of airports by ICAO code: S#SU - Uruguay
 Wikipedia: WikiProject Aviation/Airline destination lists: South America#Uruguay

References 
  Dirección Nacional de Aviación Civil e Infraestructura Aeronaútica (DINACIA)
 
  - includes IATA codes
 World Aero Data: Airports in Uruguay - ICAO codes, airport data
 Great Circle Mapper: Airports in Uruguay - IATA and ICAO codes

External links

 
Uruguay
Airports
Airports
Uruguay